Ang Peryodiko is a newspaper in Winnipeg, Manitoba, that serves Filipino Canadians of Western Canada. It is an offshoot of the Los Angeles-based newspaper of the same name, with which it shares editorials, alongside Winnipeg exclusives. It was founded in 2003 and is published thrice a month.

See also
List of newspapers in Canada

External links
Canadian edition of Ang Peryodiko
Los Angeles edition of Ang Peryodiko

Filipino-Canadian culture
Multicultural and ethnic newspapers published in Canada
Newspapers published in Winnipeg
Publications established in 2003
2003 establishments in Manitoba
Filipino-Canadian culture in Manitoba